The SIG Sauer P227 is an American-designed and produced semi-automatic pistol which was introduced in 2013 and discontinued in 2019. The P227 introduced a double-stack .45 ACP caliber handgun into the SIG Sauer lineup. It was introduced along with the P224.

Design
The P227 is similar in many ways to the P220 in .45 ACP that SIG Sauer introduced in 1975.  It uses the same SIG Sauer designed short recoil locking system with their Single/Double Action trigger.  The P220 is a full sized large pistol.  The P227 uses a double row magazine for increased ammunition capacity and is very slightly larger to the point that it is not very noticeable.  The action is automatically propped open after the firing of the last round in the magazine.  The hammer, can be safely lowered by the decocking lever.  Takedown is accomplished by removing the magazine, locking the slide open, and then turning down the takedown lever.  The slide, barrel, and recoil spring will then slide forward off of the frame.

The P227 also features the new Enhanced Ergonomics 'E2' wraparound grip, rather than the two-piece grips of the P220. The P227 has a magazine capacity of ten rounds and one in the chamber, unlike the seven- or eight-round capacity of the P220. SIG also offers a fourteen-round capacity magazine, which is included in various models.  The P227 is a double-action/single-action-operated handgun, meaning that the first trigger pull is a ten-lbs double-action pull, but all the follow-up shots are a 4.4-lbs single-action pull. The full size model is 7.7 inches in length (with a 4.4 inch barrel) and 5.5 inches in height with 1.5 inches in width. It weighs 32 ounces (907 g) with the magazine, features an accessory rail and three-dot contrast sights or SIGLITE night sights. The frame is constructed from anodized aluminum alloy with a Nitron finish and a milled stainless steel slide.

Model descriptions
As of February 2017, the P227 is offered in eight models from the SIG Sauer Web Site:

 The P227 Nitron Full Size has a 4.4-inch (112 mm) barrel and comes with polymer grips and a standard 10-round magazine magazines
 The P227 Nitron Carry has a 3.9-inch (99 mm) barrel, comes with two 10-round magazines and is smoothed off for easier concealed carry
 The P227 SAS Gen 2 Carry has a short reset trigger (SRT) and a 3.9-inch (99 mm) barrel, comes with two 10-round magazines and does not have an accessory rail
 The P227 TACOPS Full Size has a 4.4-inch (112 mm) barrel and comes with a beavertail frame, G10 grip panels, TRUGLO front and SIGLITE rear sights, front cocking serrations, front strap checkering, an extended magazine well and four 14-round magazines
 The P227 Tactical Full Size has a short reset trigger (SRT), a 5.1-inch (130 mm) threaded barrel to accept a suppressor, front strap checkering, SIGLITE sights, and came with one 10-round and one 14-round magazine(a change in model numbers signaled the exclusion of the 14-round magazine due to feeding issues; these new models instead shipped with two 10-round magazines)
 The P227 Flat Dark Earth, featuring a flat dark earth coated frame and slide, has a 4.4-inch (112 mm) barrel and it comes with a standard 10-round magazine
 The P227 Equinox has a two-tone polished slide with nickel controls, a 4.4-inch (112 mm) barrel, and it comes with a standard 10-round magazine
 The P227 Enhanced Elite has a 4.4-inch (112 mm) barrel, beavertail frame, front slide cocking serrations, a short reset trigger (SRT), a one-piece ergonomic grip, front strap checkering, and a 10-round magazine

Adoption

In 2013, the Indiana State Police adopted the SIG Sauer P227 Full Size Nitron as its department-issued sidearm. The contract calls for over 5000 P227 deliveries by the end of 2014.

In 2014, after extensive .45 ACP weapon testing involving several manufacturers, the Pennsylvania State Police selected the P227 as its department-issued sidearm.

The Connecticut State Police and Delaware State Police currently issue the P227 as its standard duty pistol.

References

External links
 Sig Sauer P227 .45 ACP by Hickok45 via YouTube

SIG Sauer semi-automatic pistols
.45 ACP semi-automatic pistols
Police weapons
Semi-automatic pistols of the United States
Weapons and ammunition introduced in 2013